Ali Rabee (Arabic:علي ربيع) (born 28 August 1981) is an Emirati footballer. He currently plays as a defender .

Career
He formerly played for Al-Rams, Emirates Club, Al-Wasl, Al-Shaab, Ajman, Al Urooba, and Al Hamriyah .

External links

References

1981 births
Living people
Emirati footballers
Al Rams Club players
Emirates Club players
Al-Wasl F.C. players
Al-Shaab CSC players
Ajman Club players
Al Urooba Club players
Al Hamriyah Club players
Dibba Al-Hisn Sports Club players
UAE Pro League players
UAE First Division League players
Association football defenders
Place of birth missing (living people)